is a Japanese football player. He plays for ReinMeer Aomori.

Career
Riku Hirosue joined J1 League club FC Tokyo in 2017.

Club statistics
Updated to 22 February 2020.

References

External links
Profile at FC Tokyo

1998 births
Living people
Association football people from Tokyo
Japanese footballers
J1 League players
J2 League players
J3 League players
FC Tokyo players
FC Tokyo U-23 players
Renofa Yamaguchi FC players
FC Machida Zelvia players
ReinMeer Aomori players
Association football goalkeepers